The Committee on Public Lands may refer to predecessors of current committees in the two houses of the United States Congress:

United States Senate Committee on Energy and Natural Resources, formerly known as the Senate Committee on Public Lands
United States House Committee on Natural Resources, formerly known as the House Committee on Public Lands